Gulab or Gulaab (Persian: گلاب gulāb) is a Persian compound noun meaning " Rose water ". The noun or name is combined from two nouns "gul" (گل) which is the generic word for "flower" or the name for "rose", and "āb" (اب) which means "water".

Generally the noun is also used as a name and a nickname in Persian poetry to mean "sweetheart, lover". It is used in Iran, Turkey, Central Asia, Afghanistan, Pakistan and India.

It may refer to:

People
Gulab Chand Kataria, the former Home Minister in the government of Rajasthan
Gulab Khandelwal (born 1924), Indian poet born in Navalgarh, Rajasthan
Gulab Singh of Jammu and Kashmir (1792–1857), the founder and first Maharaja of the princely state of Jammu and Kashmir
Gulab Singh Shaktawat (died 2006), Indian freedom fighter, social and political worker of Indian National Congress
Gulab Bai, first female artist of the traditional operatic drama

Places
Gulab, Iran, village in Iran
Gulab, Fereydunshahr, village in Iran
Gulab, Tiran and Karvan, village in Iran
Gulab-e Sofla, village in Iran
Gulab-e Vosta, village in Iran
Gulab Bari, Garden of roses

See also
Cyclones Gulab and Shaheen
Bhela Gulab Singh, town and Union Council of Depalpur Tehsil in Punjab Province, Pakistan
Gulab Bagh and Zoo (Sajjan Niwas Garden), the largest garden in Udaipur, Rajasthan
Gulab jamun, a dessert
Gulab Gang, a 2014 Bollywood film